Yngve Holmberg (21 March 1925 – 29 October 2011) was a Swedish politician in the Moderate Party, who was its leader from 1965 to 1970.

Holmberg was born in Bromma, Stockholm County. He graduated with a law degree from Stockholm University College in 1951. He became Party Secretary for the Party of the Right in 1961, and was a member of the Riksdag from 1962 to 1972. While a member of the Upper House, he was the leader of the party group in that house 1965–1968. From 1965 to 1970, he was the party leader of the Party of the Right (Högerpartiet), that in 1969 changed its name to the Moderate Party (Moderata samlingspartiet).

During Holmberg's time as leader, his party saw declining support in face of a left-wing wave in the late 1960s. Following a very poor result for the Moderate Party in the 1970 general election, Holmberg's position was challenged by the party's vice chairman Gösta Bohman, who won the vote at the party congress.

After this political career, he served as county governor of Halland County from 1972 to 1977. He was also Sweden's consul-general in Houston from 1978 to 1982.

Holmberg died 29 October 2011 in Gräddö, Stockholm County.

References

Leaders of the Moderate Party
Members of the Första kammaren
Governors of Halland County
Stockholm University alumni
1925 births
2011 deaths
Consuls-general of Sweden